The Coppin State Eagles women's basketball team represents Coppin State University in Baltimore, Maryland, United States. The school's team currently competes in the NCAA Division I in the Mid-Eastern Athletic Conference.

History
Coppin State began play in 1985. They went winless in their first season, losing all 25 games. They recorded their first win 11 games into their second season, which was their only win of that season. They recorded their first winning season in 1990–91, going 19–8. That year, they won the MEAC Tournament, beating Delaware State, South Carolina State, and North Carolina A&T. At that time, MEAC Tournament winners were not invited to the NCAA Tournament, so the Eagles closed their season out with their first ever MEAC title. Two seasons later, they won a share of MEAC regular season title, going 20–9 and 12–4 in MEAC play to share the title with South Carolina State and Florida A&M. However, they lost to South Carolina State in the Third Round of the MEAC Tournament. In 2005, they won both the regular season and tournament title, going 23–8 and 15–3 in MEAC play while beating Norfolk State in the MEAC final to win their first tournament title in twelve years and go to their first ever NCAA Tournament. They won the regular season and tournament title the following year (2006), going to their second straight NCAA Tournament. They went to the NCAA Tournament for the third time in four years after beating North Carolina A&T in the tournament final. As of the end of the 2015–16 season, the Eagles have an all-time record of 412–482.

Postseason appearances

NCAA appearances
Coppin State has appeared in the NCAA Division I women's basketball tournament three times. The Eagles have a record of 0–3.

WNIT appearances
The Eagles are 1–2 in WNIT appearances.

References

External links